The Scottish Premier League (SPL) was a football league competition that operated between 1998 and 2013. During that period, more than 100 players scored three goals (a hat-trick) or more in a single match. The first player to achieve the feat was Craig Burley, who scored three times for Celtic in a 5–0 victory against Dunfermline Athletic on the opening day of the first SPL season. Eight players scored more than three goals in a match; of these, three players, Kris Boyd (twice), Gary Hooper and Kenny Miller scored five.

Three matches featured two hat-tricks in the same game. The first two came in the same week of the 1999–2000 season. Henrik Larsson and Mark Viduka both scored three goals each in Celtic's 7–0 win against Aberdeen on 16 October 1999, then Aberdeen's Robbie Winters and Motherwell's John Spencer both scored hat-tricks in a 6–5 win for Aberdeen at Fir Park four days later. Gary Hooper and Anthony Stokes both scored hat-tricks in Celtic's league record 9–0 win against Aberdeen on 6 November 2010. Larsson and Stokes are the only players who have scored hat-tricks in consecutive matches.

Henrik Larsson scored three or more goals twelve times in the Scottish Premier League, more than any other player. Larsson, Boyd, John Hartson, Michael Higdon and Stokes were the only players to have scored more than three hat-tricks in the SPL. Six players scored hat-tricks for two different clubs: Boyd (Kilmarnock and Rangers), Higdon (St Mirren and Motherwell), Gary McSwegan (Heart of Midlothian and Kilmarnock), Colin Nish (Kilmarnock and Hibernian), Stokes (Falkirk and Celtic) and Kyle Lafferty (Rangers and Kilmarnock)

Hat-tricks

{| class="wikitable sortable"
! # !! Player !! Nationality|| For !! Against !! align=center| Result !! Date !! class="unsortable" align="center"|Ref
|-
|1 ||  ||  || Celtic* || Dunfermline Athletic || 5–0 ||  ||
|-
|2 ||  ||  || Kilmarnock* || Heart of Midlothian || 3–0 ||  ||
|-
|3 ||  ||  || Dundee United || St Johnstone* || 1–3 ||  ||
|-
|4 ||  ||  || Celtic* || Dundee || 6–1 ||  ||
|-
|5 ||  ||  || Celtic* || St Johnstone || 5–0 ||  ||
|-
|6 ||  ||  || Celtic* || Heart of Midlothian || 3–0 ||  ||
|-
|7 ||  ||  || Rangers* || Dundee || 6–1 ||  ||
|-
|8 || 4 ||  || Celtic || Motherwell* || 1–7 ||  ||
|-
|9 ||  ||  || Rangers || Kilmarnock* || 0–5 ||  ||
|-
|10 ||  ||  || Aberdeen* || Dunfermline Athletic || 3–1 ||  ||
|-
|11 ||  ||  || Heart of Midlothian || Aberdeen* || 2–5 ||  ||
|-
|12
|4
|
|Rangers*
|Motherwell
|4–1
|
|
|-
|13 ||  ||  || Heart of Midlothian* || Aberdeen|| 3–0 || ||
|-
|14 ||  ||  || Celtic* || Aberdeen|| 7–0 || ||
|-
|15 ||  ||  || Celtic* || Aberdeen|| 7–0 || ||
|-
|16 ||  ||  || Aberdeen|| Motherwell* || 5–6 || ||
|-
|17 ||  ||  || Motherwell* || Aberdeen|| 5–6 || ||
|-
|18 ||  ||  || Rangers|| Aberdeen* || 1–5 || ||
|-
|19 ||  ||  || Celtic* || Kilmarnock|| 5–1 || ||
|-
|20 ||  ||  || Rangers|| Dundee* || 1–7 || ||
|-
|21 ||  ||  || Celtic* || Dundee|| 6–2 || ||
|-
|22 ||  ||  || Rangers* || Motherwell|| 6–2 || ||
|-
|23 ||  ||  || Celtic* || Aberdeen|| 5–1 || ||
|-
|24 ||  ||  || Dundee|| Dundee United|| 3–0 || ||
|-
|25 ||  ||  || Aberdeen|| Dundee United* || 3–5 || ||
|-
|26 ||  ||  || Hibernian* || Heart of Midlothian|| 6–2 || ||
|-
|27 || 5||  || Rangers* || St Mirren|| 7–1 || ||
|-
|28 ||  ||  || Celtic* || Aberdeen|| 6–0 || ||
|-
|29 ||  ||  || Kilmarnock|| St Mirren* || 1–3 || ||
|-
|30 || 4||  || Celtic* || Kilmarnock|| 6–0 || ||
|-
|31 ||  ||  || Celtic|| Heart of Midlothian* || 0–3 || ||
|-
|32 ||  ||  || Aberdeen* || St Mirren|| 3–0 || ||
|-
|33 ||  ||  || Aberdeen* || Dundee United|| 4–1 || ||
|-
|34 ||  ||  || Rangers|| Dundee United* || 1–6 || ||
|-
|35 ||  ||  || Aberdeen|| Dundee* || 1–4 || ||
|-
|36 ||  ||  || Celtic* || Dundee United|| 5–1 || ||
|-
|37 ||  ||  || Motherwell* || Hibernian|| 4–0 || ||
|-
|38 ||  ||  || Celtic* || Dunfermline Athletic|| 5–0 || ||
|-
|39 ||  ||  || Celtic* || Livingston|| 5–1 || ||
|-
|40 || 4||  || Heart of Midlothian* || Hibernian|| 5–1 || ||
|-
|41 || ||  || Rangers* || Dunfermline Athletic*|| 0–6 || ||
|-
|42 ||  ||  || Celtic* || Kilmarnock|| 5–0 || ||
|-
|43 || 4||  || Celtic* || Aberdeen|| 7–0 || ||
|-
|44 ||  ||  || Partick Thistle* || Kilmarnock|| 3–0 || ||
|-
|45 ||  ||  || Rangers* || Livingston|| 4–3 || ||
|-
|46 ||  ||  || Rangers* || Dundee United|| 3–1 || ||
|-
|47 ||  ||  || Celtic* || Heart of Midlothian|| 4–2 || ||
|-
|48 || 4||  || Kilmarnock* || Hibernian|| 6–2 || ||
|-
|49 ||  ||  || Motherwell* || Livingston|| 6–2 || ||
|-
|50 ||  ||  || Celtic* || Livingston|| 5–1 || ||
|-
|51 ||  ||  || Celtic* || Aberdeen|| 4–0 || ||
|-
|52 ||  ||  || Celtic|| Kilmarnock* || 0–5 || ||
|-
|53 ||  ||  || Celtic|| Dundee United* || 1–5 || ||
|-
|54 ||  ||  || Motherwell* || Dundee United|| 3–1 || ||
|-
|55 ||  ||  || Dundee United* || Kilmarnock|| 4–1 || ||
|-
|56 || 5||  || Kilmarnock* || Dundee United|| 5–2 || ||
|-
|57 ||  ||  || Dunfermline Athletic* || Dundee|| 3–1 || ||
|-
|58 ||  ||  || Hibernian* || Kilmarnock|| 3–0 || ||
|-
|59 ||  ||  || Celtic|| Dundee United* || 2–3 || ||
|-
|60 ||  ||  || Celtic|| Livingston* || 0–4 || ||
|-
|61 ||  ||  || Dunfermline Athletic* || Dundee|| 5–0 || ||
|-
|62 ||  ||  || Celtic|| Motherwell* || 4–4 || ||
|-
|63 ||  ||  || Kilmarnock* || Livingston|| 3–0 || ||
|-
|64 ||  ||  || Hibernian|| Rangers* || 0–3 || ||
|-
|65 ||  ||  || Celtic* || Motherwell|| 5–0 || ||
|-
|66 ||  ||  || Rangers|| Kilmarnock* || 2–3 || ||
|-
|67 || 4||  || Celtic|| Dunfermline Athletic* || 1–8 || ||
|-
|68 ||  ||  || Rangers|| Dundee United* || 1–4 || ||
|-
|69 ||  ||  || Celtic|| Dundee United* || 1–4 || ||
|-
|70 ||  ||  || Falkirk* || Dundee United|| 5–1 || ||
|-
|71 ||  ||  || Falkirk|| Dunfermline Athletic* || 0–3 || ||
|-
|72 ||  ||  || Celtic|| St Mirren* || 1–3 || ||
|-
|73 ||  ||  || Falkirk* || Inverness CT|| 3–1 || ||
|-
|74 ||  ||  || Falkirk|| Dundee United* || 1–5 || ||
|-
|75 ||  ||  || Celtic* || St Mirren|| 5–1 || ||
|-
|76 ||  ||  || Rangers|| Kilmarnock* || 1–3 || ||
|-
|77 ||  ||  || Rangers* || Aberdeen|| 3–0 || ||
|-
|78 ||  ||  || Dundee United|| Heart of Midlothian* || 0–4 || ||
|-
|79 ||  ||  || Celtic* || Dundee United|| 3–0 || ||
|-
|80 ||  ||  || Hibernian* || Kilmarnock|| 4–1 || ||
|-
|81 ||  ||  || Celtic* || Motherwell|| 3–0 || ||
|-
|82 ||  ||  || Celtic* || Falkirk|| 4–0 || ||
|-
|83 ||  ||  || Dundee United* || Heart of Midlothian|| 4–1 || ||
|-
|84 ||  ||  || Hibernian* || Gretna|| 4–2 || ||
|-
|85 ||  ||  || Rangers* || Inverness CT|| 5–0 || ||
|-
|86 ||  ||  || Rangers* || Hamilton Academical|| 7–1 || ||
|-
|87 ||  ||  || Motherwell* || Inverness CT|| 3–2 || ||
|-
|88 ||  ||  || Celtic* || St Mirren|| 7–0 || ||
|-
|89 ||  ||  || Kilmarnock* || Falkirk|| 3–0 || ||
|-
|90 ||  ||  || St Johnstone|| Motherwell* || 1–3 || ||
|-
|91 || 5||  || Rangers* || Dundee United|| 7–1 || ||
|-
|92 ||  ||  || Dundee United|| Falkirk* || 1–4 || ||
|-
|93 ||  ||  || Hibernian|| Motherwell* || 6–6|| ||
|- 
|94 ||  ||  || Aberdeen* || Hamilton Academical|| 4–0 || ||
|- 
|95 ||  ||  || Rangers|| Hibernian* || 0–3 || ||
|- 
|96 ||  ||  || Heart of Midlothian* || St Mirren|| 3–0 || ||
|-
|97 ||  ||  || Celtic* || Aberdeen|| 9–0|| ||
|-
|98 ||  ||  ||Celtic* || Aberdeen|| 9–0 || ||
|-
|99 ||  ||  || Motherwell* || St Johnstone|| 4–0 || ||
|-
|100 ||  ||  || Rangers|| Kilmarnock* || 2–3 || ||
|- 
|101 ||   ||  || Inverness CT* || Hibernian|| 4–2 || ||
|-
|102 ||  ||  || Rangers* || Motherwell|| 6–0 || ||
|-
|103 ||  ||  || St Mirren* || Hamilton Academical|| 3–1 || ||
|-
|104 ||  ||  || Dundee United* || Motherwell|| 4–0 || ||
|-
|105 ||  ||  || Rangers|| Kilmarnock* || 1–5 || ||
|-
|106 ||  ||  || Aberdeen* || Dunfermline Athletic|| 4–0 || ||
|-
|107 ||  ||  || Inverness CT|| Kilmarnock* || 3–6 || ||
|-
|108 ||  ||  || Celtic* || St Mirren|| 5–0 || ||
|-
|109 ||  ||  || Heart of Midlothian* || St Mirren|| 5–2 || ||
|-
|110 ||  ||  || Motherwell* || Hibernian|| 4–3 || ||
|-
|111 ||  ||  || St Mirren* || Dunfermline Athletic|| 4–4 || ||
|-
|112 || 5||  || Celtic* || Heart of Midlothian|| 5–0 || ||
|-
|113 ||  ||  || Rangers|| St Johnstone* || 0–4 || ||
|-
|114 ||  ||  || Motherwell* || Inverness CT|| 4–1 || ||
|-
|115 ||  ||  || Kilmarnock|| Heart of Midlothian* || 1–3 || ||
|-
|116 ||  ||  || Inverness CT|| Dundee United* || 4–4 || ||
|-
|117 ||  ||  || Aberdeen|| Dundee* || 1–3 || ||
|-
|118 ||  ||  || Dundee United|| Kilmarnock* || 2–3 || ||
|-
|119 ||  ||  || Motherwell* || St Johnstone|| 3–2 || ||
|-
|120 ||  ||  || Kilmarnock|| Heart of Midlothian* || 0–3 || ||
|-
|121 ||  ||  || Inverness CT* || Motherwell || 4–3 ||  ||

Multiple hat-tricks

Notes 

 The Scottish Premier League was the top tier of the Scottish football league system. It was formed in 1998 and was disestablished in 2013.

 The results column shows the home team score first.

References

Hat-tricks
Hat-tricks
Scottish Premier League